Statistics South Africa (frequently shortened to Stats SA) is the national statistical service of South Africa with the goal of producing timely, accurate and official statistics, in order to advance economic growth, development and democracy.  To this end, Statistics South Africa produces official demographic, economic and social censuses and surveys.  To date Statistics South Africa has produced three censuses, in 1996, 2001 and 2011. Stats SA was previously known as the "Central Statistical Service", shortly after the end of apartheid and also it absorbed the statistical services of the former Transkei, Bophuthatswana, Venda and Ciskei.

Surveys conducted 
 1999 Survey of Activities of Young People, or the SAYP.
 South African National Census of 2001
 2007 Community Survey
 South African National Census of 2011
 South African National Census of 2022

Criticism 
Statistics South Africa has been criticised for not producing accurate figures on immigration and inflation.

References

External links 

 Statistics Act, no. 6 of 1999 from polity.org.za

Government departments of South Africa
Scientific organisations based in South Africa
South Africa